The 2014 World Junior Wrestling Championships were the 38th edition of the World Junior Wrestling Championships and were held in Zagreb, Croatia between August 5–10, 2014.

Medal table

Team ranking

Medal summary

Men's freestyle

Men's Greco-Roman

Women's freestyle

References

World Junior Championships
Wrestling Championships
International wrestling competitions hosted by Croatia
Sport in Croatia
Wrestling in Croatia
World Junior Wrestling Championships